The DFU Elk Mountain Bridge was a Warren pony truss bridge located near Elk Mountain, Wyoming, which carried Carbon County Road 120-1 over the Medicine Bow River. The bridge was built in 1823 by contractor D. B. Miller. While the bridge's design is mainly a Warren truss, the top chord of the bridge is reminiscent of a Parker truss.

The bridge was added to the National Register of Historic Places on February 15, 1995. It was one of several bridges added to the NRHP for its role in the history of Wyoming bridge construction. The bridge was replaced between 2017 and 2020.

See also
List of bridges documented by the Historic American Engineering Record in Wyoming

References

External links

Road bridges on the National Register of Historic Places in Wyoming
Bridges completed in 1923
Buildings and structures in Carbon County, Wyoming
Historic American Engineering Record in Wyoming
National Register of Historic Places in Carbon County, Wyoming
Warren truss bridges in the United States
1923 establishments in Wyoming